Ebony College, Luweero is a day and boarding secondary school in the district of Luweero in Uganda. The school was founded in 2002 by Edward Makumbi and Olivia Makumbi, and was officially opened in 2003.

Location
The school is based in Luweero within Luweero District, 74 km (47 min) by road north of the capital city Kampala.

History
Construction began in January 2002 and by December 2002, eight structures (blocks) were up, six classrooms, an administration block and a staff room.

Ebony College officially opened in January 2003 with fifteen students, four staff members, and continued to grow. By the end of 2009, the school had five hundred and forty students, with a teaching staff of over twenty eight teachers.

Description
Ebony College offers O level and A level education, and is currently run by headteacher Cylus Waggwa, a former head teacher of King David High School of Wakiso district. The school organizes annual events, functions and concerts, and places a strong emphasis on Christian education.

Academia

Subjects taught
Agriculture
Art & design
Biology
Chemistry
Commerce studies (O level)
Christian religious studies
English language
English literature
Entrepreneurship (A level)
Geography
History
Information communication technology
Islamic religious studies 
Luganda language
Mathematics
Physics

Universal Secondary education
In 2010 the school officially partnered up with the governments nationwide Universal Secondary Education (USE) policy, a development goal implemented to increase educational opportunities for students throughout the country.

Student life

Sport
The school runs football and netball teams, which compete in post primary games. The school also runs over 10 clubs.

Student housing
All boarding students are guaranteed accommodation in the gender-segregated student dormitories, and have access to the 25 acre land which the school sits on.

References

 Prince Kanakulya .Z. Jjuuko "Ebony College (Welcome to Ebony College)" Retrieved 30 August 2010, https://web.archive.org/web/20100901074656/http://ebonycollege.net/
 Herbert Kamoga .B. " Ebony College (Pass through Ebony College for a bright future)

Boarding schools in Uganda
Christian schools in Uganda
Mixed schools in Uganda
Luweero District
Educational institutions established in 2003
2003 establishments in Uganda